Bullio is a small village in the Southern Highlands of New South Wales, Australia, in Wingecarribee Shire. 

At the 2021 census, there were 79 people living at Bullio.

References 

Towns of the Southern Highlands (New South Wales)